Lizard Lake  is a lake in Gunnison County, Colorado. The lake is located within the boundaries of the White River National Forest, between Marble and the ghost town of Crystal, along Crystal City Road (FSR #314). The lake has views of Whitehouse Mountain (to the southeast), and is near Sheep Mountain (to the northeast) and Hat Mountain (to the southwest). The name Lizard Lake is a misnomer for the salamanders (not lizards) with feather-like gills inhabiting the lake, seen along the mud lake bottom and floating above the aquatic vegetation.

Access
Lizard Lake is located on public land, however physical access to Lizard Lake is limited due to terrain and road conditions. A high clearance vehicle or other means of transportation is required to reach the lake (e.g. foot, horse, mountain bike, off-road vehicle). Pets are allowed on the trail connecting to Lizard Lake.

Prohibited activities
The use of motor boats is prohibited on the lake, as indicated by a sign on the shoreline which reads:

External links

References

Lakes of Colorado
Colorado